Project N95 is a nonprofit organization which runs a website devoted to the sale of N95 masks and COVID-19 tests. The website functions as a PPE clearinghouse, connecting buyers directly to manufacturers.

It was founded by Anne Miller. Her mother-in-law was among the first residents of the state of Vermont to die of COVID-19.

The nonprofit sells N95 masks for about $1 each.

References

External links
 Official website

Medical masks